Keith Taylor may refer to:

Politicians
 Keith Taylor (British politician) (1953–2022), English politician and senior figure in the Green Party of England and Wales
 Charles Keith Taylor (born 1931), known as Keith Taylor, Canadian politician

Sportspeople
 Keith Taylor (safety) (born 1964), American football player
 Keith Taylor (cornerback) (born 1998), American football player

Others
 Keith Taylor (author) (born 1946), Australian science fiction and fantasy writer
 Keith Taylor (historian) (born 1946), American sinologist, historian and writer
 Keith Taylor (poet) (born 1951), Canadian poet, translator and professor
 Keith Taylor (political scientist) (1949–2006), British political scientist
 Keith A. Taylor (born 1961), United States Coast Guard admiral